This is a list of Norwegian governments with parties and Prime Ministers. Within coalition governments the parties are listed according to parliamentary representation with the most popular party first. The Prime Ministers' parties are italicized.

Governments

Between 1814 and 1884
With exception of the Cabinet of 1814, that was appointed by the then Crown-Prince of Denmark, Christian Fredrik, all the cabinets were appointed by the King of Sweden, who was also King of Norway.

Between 1884 and 1945
In 1884 the parliamentary system was introduced in Norway. Since then, all governments had to have support in the Parliament of Norway, and consisted of party member ministers.

De facto Governments during World War II
During the German occupation of Norway during World War II there were four cabinets, that ruled as part of Josef Terbovens administration of Norway. These Governments were the de facto ruling body of Norway during the war, though the Cabinet Nygaardsvold still held the de jure office, in exile in London, United Kingdom.

Governments since 1945

Parties
The following parties have had cabinet seats.

Communist Party (NKP) (Norges Kommunistiske Parti)
Socialist Left Party (SV) (Sosialistisk Venstreparti)
Labour Party (Ap) (Det norske Arbeiderparti)
Centre Party (Sp) (Senterpartiet) – formerly known as the Agrarian Party, Bondepartiet
Christian Democrats (KrF) (Kristelig Folkeparti)
Liberal Party (V) (Venstre)
Coalition Party (Samlingspartiet)
Liberal Left Party (FV) (Frisinnede Venstre)
Moderate Liberal Party (MV) (Moderate Venstre)
Conservative Party (H) (Høyre)
National Unification (NS) (Nasjonal Samling)

See also 
Elections in Norway
List of heads of government of Norway

References 

Governments
Governments
Governments
 
Norway